Ladri di Carrozzelle ("Wheelchair Thieves" as the name is a play on the film Bicycle Thieves) is an Italian Pop rock group that formed due to a summer event in 1989 for the Union for the Fight Against Muscular Dystrophy. That said not all the members have Muscular dystrophy or use wheelchairs. In 2004 the group had 11 members in total with 8 in wheelchairs. They have put out several albums and performed at World Youth Day. The music they play varies from heavy metal to funk to pop.

Members

Current 
Paolo Falessi "Falex" - guitar
Anna di Stefano "Gnappa"  - singer
Alessandro Tordeschi "Saso" - singer
Manuela Gasbarri "Manu" - singer
Domenico Aldorasi "Mr President" - Keyboard
Roberto Pucci "Pucci" - bass guitar
Massimo Cavallaro "Cavallino" - drums
Daniele Placidi "Micio" - drums
Massimiliano Sciaqua "Koala" - drums
Mario Contarino "Contarillo" - drums
Emiliano Esposti "Roscio" - guitar
Rosario Contarino "Mr Obvius" - drums

Former members 

Luca Bassani - (2000-2005)
Fabiano Lioi  "Frodo" - instrumentalist - (2002-2006)
Pino Costanzi - guitar (1989-1998)
Guido e Roberto Garofolini - (1989-1993)
Massimo Paolini - (1989-1992)
Piero Pasquavaglio - (1989-2000)
Mario Stranci - (1989-1992)

Discography 

1992 - Distrofichetto (single)
1993 - Chi non salta
1997 - Cambio di rotta
1998 - In concerto? (live)
1998 - Anima mia (cd singolo)
1999 - Scuolatour
2000 - Sparta (e dintorni)
2003 - Live? (live)
2005 - Come un battito d'ali

Web sources

External links
Ladri's home page

Italian rock music groups